Srebrna Góra ("silver hill") may refer to the following places in Poland:
Srebrna Góra, Lower Silesian Voivodeship (south-west Poland)
Srebrna Góra, Greater Poland Voivodeship (west-central Poland)